Julia is a Mexican telenovela produced by Irene Sabido for Televisa in 1979.

Cast 
Lupita Ferrer as Julia
Pedro Armendáriz Jr.
Víctor Junco
Miguel Manzano
María Eugenia Ríos
Javier Ruán
Oscar Servin
Marta Aura
Jorge Lavat
Rosario Granados

References

External links 

Mexican telenovelas
1979 telenovelas
Televisa telenovelas
Spanish-language telenovelas
1979 Mexican television series debuts
1979 Mexican television series endings